Francesco Giangiacomo (1783 – 22 February 1864) was an Italian illustrator and engraver.

Life
He was born in Rome, where he attended the Accademia di San Luca. Giangiacomo after 1801 was engaged and taught by Jean-Baptiste Wicar to document through engravings many of the works in Rome. He pursued this career for decades, and later became an instructor at the Academy. Among his pupils were the sculptor Luigi Amici, Luigi Calamatta, Paolo Mercuri, Paolo Neri, and Francesco's son Tertulliano.

He became a member of the Congregazione de Virtuosi al Pantheon. He engraved Pinturicchio frescoes for the cloister of Santa Maria del Popolo, Sant'Onofrio, and for the Riario Chapel of Santa Maria del Popolo.

References

Italian engravers
Painters from Rome
1783 births
1864 deaths
19th-century Italian painters
19th-century Italian male artists
Italian male painters
Italian neoclassical painters